Abapo Airport  was a public use airport in the Santa Cruz Department of Bolivia.

The runway seen in a 2016 aerial image at the coordinates given is overgrown with scrub and brush, with no access road apparent. The location is  distant from Abapó.

See also

Transport in Bolivia
List of airports in Bolivia

References

External links 
 OurAirports - Abapo
 OpenStreetMap - Abapo

Defunct airports
Airports in Santa Cruz Department (Bolivia)